Belmont House is a Georgian country house on the island of Unst, the most northerly of the Shetland Islands, Scotland. It was constructed in 1775 by Shetland landowner Thomas Mouat of Garth, and has been described as "possibly the most ambitious, least-altered classical mansion in the Northern Isles." The house was restored from a derelict state between 1996 and 2010 by the Belmont Trust. The house is now used as a self catering holiday house and venue for events. It is protected as a category A listed building, and the grounds are included on the Inventory of Gardens and Designed Landscapes in Scotland, the national listing of significant gardens.

For holidays and events 
Belmont House is used by visitors and locals as a self-catering venue for holidays, weddings and other events and is managed by the Belmont Trust as a not-for-profit enterprise, with any surplus funds reinvested in the house and community.

The house was restored from 1996 to 2010 to its original Georgian elegance but with the addition of modern amenities. It is furnished with Georgian furniture and comfortable new beds and settees. The property can sleep up to 12 people.

Gardens 
Walled gardens are laid out to the south of the house. These have been restored by The Belmont Trust with walls restored and trees and shrubs planted to form sheltered spaces to sit and enjoy the views over Bluemull sound to the south.  The gardens are open to the public.

History
Belmont was built in 1775, with the farm square to the rear complete by 1790; together they form “miniature Palladian classical groups with flanking pavilion wings” (ref Buildings of the Land: Scotland's farms 1750–2000, Miles Glendinning and Susanna Martins, ed Piers Dixon; RCAHMS 2008).  Surrounding enclosures including garden grounds form a regular layout running down to the sea. The house and adjacent farm square are designated category A, and the grounds are included on the Inventory of Gardens and Designed Landscapes in Scotland.

The house was built for Thomas Mouat, whose father William was laird of the Garth estate in Shetland. Thomas visited Lothian, around Edinburgh, to gather ideas on contemporary architecture, and may have been influenced by Hopetoun House.

In the early 19th century the east wing was added to the house (now demolished), but otherwise it has remained unaltered. The Mouat family continued to occupy the house until the mid 20th century. It was then sold, and became derelict. In 1996 the Belmont Trust was established to oversee the restoration of the house. Over the following 15 years works were carried out, largely by local craftsmen, to bring the building back into use. The Belmont Trust operated as self-catering accommodation and as a venue for hire until 2021.  The property was sold in 2021 and is now operating as a holiday and event venue by its new owners . The original interiors are described by Historic Scotland as "a particularly remarkable survival."

References

External links

Belmont House website

Category A listed buildings in Shetland
Listed houses in Scotland
Inventory of Gardens and Designed Landscapes
Houses completed in 1775
Country houses in Shetland
Unst